Sporting Club Cilu is a football club in Lukala, Democratic Republic of Congo. They play in the Linafoot, the top level of professional football in DR Congo.  They competed in the 2004 CAF Champions League, going out in the first round, and  won the Unifac Clubs Cup in 2006

Honours
Linafoot
 Runners-up (1): 2003
Coupe du Congo
Winners (1): 2004
 Runners-up (1):  2005
Super Coupe du Congo
Winners (1): 2004
Unifac Clubs Cup
 Winners (1): 2006
Ligue de Football Bas-Congo (LIFBACO)
 Winners (10): 1983, 1984, 2001, 2002, 2003, 2004, 2005, 2006, 2007, 2008

Performance in CAF competitions
CAF Champions League:
2004 – Preliminary Round

CAF Confederation Cup: 1 appearance
2005 – First Round

References

External links
Team profile – leballonrond.fr

Football clubs in the Democratic Republic of the Congo
Association football clubs established in 1939
1939 establishments in the Belgian Congo